The women's C-1 5000 metres competition at the 2019 ICF Canoe Sprint World Championships in Szeged took place at the Olympic Centre of Szeged.

Schedule
The schedule was as follows:

All times are Central European Summer Time (UTC+2)

Results
As a long-distance event, it was held as a direct final.

References

ICF
ICF